The 1911 Columbus Panhandles season was an American football team played professional football in the Ohio League. The team compiled a 7–2–1 record and played its home games at Indianola Park in Columbus, Ohio.

Schedule

Players
Player information is based on box scores in published game accounts.
 Boyer - end
 Bushby - end
 Curtman - center
 Davis - halfback
 Drake - quarterback
 Griffin/Griffith - end
 James - quarterback
 Jarvis - quarterback
 Keener - halfback
 Kertzinger - center
 E. Kuehner - tackle
 O. Kuehner - tackle
 McLease - tackle
 A. Nesser - guard
 F. Nesser - halfback
 F. Nesser - fullback
 J. Nesser - halfback
 P. Nesser - tackle
 R. Nesser - fullback
 T. Nesser - guard
 Shea - halfback
 Snyder - guard
 Turvey - end
 Wyant - guard

References

Columbus Panhandles seasons
Columbus Panhandles
Columbus Panhandles